Gerald Smedley Andrews,  (December 12, 1903 – December 5, 2006) was a Canadian frontier teacher, land surveyor, and soldier.

Born in Winnipeg, Manitoba, he was educated in Vancouver, Toronto, Oxford, and Dresden. From 1922 to 1930, he was a school master at Big Bar Creek and Kelly Lake. In 1930, he became a land surveyor until World War II. During World War II, he rose to the rank of Lieutenant-Colonel. From 1946 to 1950, he served as Chief Air Survey Engineer for British Columbia. From 1952 to 1968, he was the Surveyors General of the Province of British Columbia and Director of Mapping and Provincial Boundaries Commissioner.

For his services, during World War II, he was made a Member of the Order of the British Empire. In 1990, he was awarded the Order of British Columbia and was made a Member of the Order of Canada. He died a week before his 103rd birthday.

References

External links
 

1903 births
2005 deaths
Canadian centenarians
20th-century Canadian civil servants
Members of the Order of British Columbia
Members of the Order of Canada
Men centenarians
Canadian Members of the Order of the British Empire
People from Winnipeg